Karel Nováček and Mats Wilander were the defending champions, but did not participate this year.

Jiří Novák and David Rikl won the title, defeating Shelby Cannon and Francisco Montana 6–4, 4–6, 6–1 in the final.

Seeds

  Tomás Carbonell /  Francisco Roig (quarterfinals)
  Sergio Casal /  Emilio Sánchez (semifinals)
  Jiří Novák /  David Rikl (champions)
  Nuno Marques /  Jack Waite (first round)

Draw

Draw

References
Draw

Chile Open (tennis)
1995 ATP Tour